Jerzy Dietl (28 April 1927 – 23 February 2021) was a Polish economist and politician who served as a Senator from 1989 to 1991.

References

1927 births
2021 deaths
Polish economists
Polish politicians
People from Inowrocław
Recipients of the Order of Polonia Restituta (1944–1989)